The Turkish Space Agency (TUA) is a government agency for national aerospace research in Turkey. It was formally established by a presidential decree on 13 December 2018.

Headquartered in Ankara, the agency is subordinated to the Ministry of Industry and Technology. With the establishment of TUA, the Department for Aviation and Space Technologies at the Ministry of Transportation and Infrastructure was abolished. TUA prepares strategic plans that include medium and long-term goals, basic principles and approaches, objectives and priorities, performance measures, methods to be followed and resource allocation for aerospace science and technologies.

TUA works in close collaboration with the TÜBİTAK Space Technologies Research Institute (TÜBİTAK UZAY). It is administrated by an executive board of seven members. The tenure of board members, the chairperson excluded, is three years.

National Space Program 
Preliminary ten objectives:

 In 2023 (the centennial of the Republic) Turkey will perform a hard landing on the moon.
 A new company will be established for satellite production.
 Work and strive for regional superiority.
 A spaceport will be established in the country. And possibly one in Somalia.
 Competence in space will be increased by researching space weather and meteorology.
 Meteorites, planets and more in space will be tracked from Earth.
 The space industry will conduct integrated studies.
 A space technologies development zone will be established.
 Undergraduate and graduate education focus on space and aviation.
 A Turkish citizen astronaut will be sent to space.

The last objective is planned for the second half of 2023 by sending a Turkish citizen to the International Space Station (ISS) within the scope of the Turkish Space Traveler and Science Mission project.

Duties 

The agency's duties and areas of authority are:

 To prepare and implement the National Space Program in line with the policies determined by the president.
 To prepare strategic plans that include medium and long-term goals, basic principles and approaches, goals and priorities, performance criteria, methods to achieve these and resource allocations for space and aviation science and technologies.
 Developing a competitive aerospace and aviation industry, expanding the use of space and aviation technologies in line with the welfare of society and national interests, developing scientific and technological infrastructures and human resources in the field of space and aviation technologies, increasing capacity and capabilities, acquiring facilities and technologies that will provide independent access to space, To carry out or have the necessary work done so that other sectors of the national industry can benefit from the expertise and knowledge in the field of space and aviation science and technologies.
 Deciding on the use of the rights under national sovereignty regarding spacecraft and space systems, except for the spectrum and orbit allocation and coordination activities carried out within the national scope and within the International Telecommunication Union (ITU) and the duties carried out by the Information Technologies and Communication Authority, and the management and exercise of these rights To determine the procedures and principles regarding these rights and to fulfill the requirements of national obligations related to these rights, to sign a contract for the operation of space ground stations, to ensure coordination between space ground stations, to coordinate with national and international organizations to protect and secure the rights and interests of our country in space.
 Keeping records of objects launched into space in accordance with international conventions on behalf of the State, carrying out registration procedures with the United Nations or authorizing them to carry out registration procedures.
 Conducting or coordinating operations for human or unmanned access to space and exploration of space with commercial, scientific and research-development purposes.
 To carry out plans, projects and studies in order to ensure the design, production, integration and necessary tests of all kinds of products, technologies, systems, facilities, tools and equipment related to space and aviation, including satellites, launch vehicles and systems, aircraft, simulators, space platforms, or have it made.
 To grant and coordinate the necessary permissions and coordination for the domestic launch, orbit and return of satellite and spacecraft to be sent to space by public institutions and organizations and private sector organizations; to record notifications regarding launch, orbit and return from abroad.
 To organize and monitor all kinds of design, analysis, production, test, operation and integration activities in the field of space and air vehicles and space ground systems, and to authorize and carry out the processes when necessary.
 Space and aviation science and technologies; To ensure coordination with the relevant institutions in the works to be carried out for the development of the country, ensuring national security, protecting public health and the environment, determining natural resources and agricultural productivity, early detection of natural disasters and reducing the damages caused by natural disasters, following international agreements and obligations.
 To lead the development of interest and curiosity in space and aviation science and technologies throughout the country; For this purpose, to make necessary publications to reach the public in the fields of interest and activity of the Agency, to prepare and present content in all kinds of communication media, to organize events and to support activities for this purpose.
 In order to ensure national security and public order, to establish the standards of the data obtained as a result of the work carried out within the scope of the Agency's duty, to ensure that it is processed, stored and used when necessary, and to regulate the terms of sharing.
 To determine the procedures and principles regarding the export of critical space and aviation technologies owned by the country in coordination with the relevant institutions and organizations.
 Conducting research for the development of experimental space and aircraft, space and ground systems, subsystems, equipment and components, and exploration of space; To cooperate with universities, other institutions and organizations engaged in scientific activities or to coordinate the execution of necessary studies in order to design, develop and provide the necessary systems and tools.
 Without prejudice to the provisions of other relevant legislation, taking into account the international standards regarding space and aviation science and technologies, to carry out studies to determine the country standards in coordination with relevant institutions and organizations.
 To prepare R&D and high technology entrepreneurship support programs in order to reduce foreign dependency in space and aviation science and technologies, to increase international competitiveness, to create scientific and technological infrastructure and to develop all kinds of new technologies.
 To support studies related to astronomy and space sciences and to coordinate the studies carried out at national level, to support studies on the development of observation and measurement systems technologies and to develop international cooperation.
 To work on finance, law, management, business administration, marketing and similar subjects that support the development and dissemination of applications related to space and aviation science and technologies.
 To follow the developments in international space law and to cooperate with equivalent foreign organizations, to carry out all kinds of studies including legislation on space law.
 To be a member of regional or international organizations and organizations related to space and aviation technologies, to establish connections with international organizations and countries on matters related to their field of duty, to assign personnel to represent our country before international organizations, organizations and agreements.
 Performing other duties assigned by the Minister.

Administrators

See also
 List of government space agencies
 Science and technology in Turkey
 Turkish Space Systems, Integration and Test Center
 Space Launch System (Turkey)
 Space Camp Turkey
 Turkish Aerospace Industries

References 

Space agencies
Research institutes in Turkey
Aviation in Turkey
Aerospace research institutes
Space technology research institutes
Aeronautics organizations
Organizations based in Ankara
Space program of Turkey
2018 establishments in Turkey
Organizations established in 2018